Madukkarai railway station is a train station in Madukkarai, situated west of Coimbatore, at the extreme western part of the state of Tamil Nadu. The station is a part of the Southern Railway zone and is one of the stations in the Palakkad railway division. It is located on Palathurai Road, 17 km away from the Coimbatore Airport

External links
 

Railway stations in Coimbatore
Palakkad railway division